ISD may refer to:

Schools
 Illinois School for the Deaf
 Indiana School for the Deaf, Indianapolis, Indiana
 International School of Dakar, Senegal
 International School Dhaka, Bangladesh
 International School of Düsseldorf, Germany
 International School of Dongguan, Guangdong, China
 International School of Design, Valenciennes, France

Other
 Industrial Union of Donbas, Ukrainian corporation
 Independence Public School District, a school district headquartered in Independence, Missouri
 Independent school district
 Interboro School District, a school district headquartered in Prospect Park, Pennsylvania, in the Philadelphia area
 Information Services Department of the Hong Kong Government
 Information Services Division of NHS National Services Scotland
 Inhibited sexual desire, old name for hypoactive sexual desire disorder
 In-school detention
 Institute for Strategic Dialogue, London-based international affairs think tank
 Instructional systems design, also known as instructional design
 International Subscriber Dialling, also known as International Direct Dialling
 Internal Security Department (Singapore) of the Republic of Singapore
 Internal Security Department (Brunei) of Brunei
 Team ISD, professional cycling team